NFL Fever 2002 is an American football video game published and developed by Microsoft Game Studios. It was released on November 15, 2001 as a launch title for the Xbox video game console. The game was preceded by NFL Fever 2000 (which was for Microsoft Windows only), and was followed by NFL Fever 2003.

Reception

The game received "generally favorable reviews" according to the review aggregation website Metacritic. NextGen said that the game "might be the 'out of nowhere' system seller that NFL 2K1 was for Dreamcast."

By July 2006, the game had sold 600,000 copies and earned $26 million in the U.S. NextGen ranked it as the 99th highest-selling game launched for the PlayStation 2, Xbox or GameCube between January 2000 and July 2006 in that country. Combined sales of the NFL Fever series reached 1.2 million units in the United States by July 2006.

References

External links 

2001 video games
Microsoft games
NFL Fever video games
North America-exclusive video games
Video games developed in the United States
Xbox games
Xbox-only games